Thomas Wood (March 7, 1815 – November 13, 1898) was a Canadian farmer and politician.

Born in Dunham, Lower Canada, Wood was appointed to the Legislative Council of Quebec for Bedford in 1867 and served until 1898.

References

External links
 

1815 births
1898 deaths
People from Montérégie
Conservative Party of Quebec MLCs
Anglophone Quebec people